Chief John Big Tree (born Isaac Johnny John, June 2, 1877 – July 6, 1967) was a member of the Seneca Nation and an actor who appeared in 59 films between 1915 and 1950. He was born in Buffalo, New York and died in Onondaga Indian Reservation, New York. His interment was also there.

Big Tree claimed to be one of three Native American chiefs whose profiles were composited to make the portrait featured on the obverse of the United States' Indian Head nickel, designed by sculptor James Earle Fraser. The other two chiefs were Iron Tail and Two Moons. Big Tree claimed that his profile was used to create that portion of the portrait from the top of the forehead to the upper lip.

Big Tree also claimed to be the sole model for Fraser's most recognized work, the doleful End of the Trail. Both of these claims are broadly disputed, and Fraser identified other models.

He also appeared on the March 1964 cover of Esquire magazine, in a pose commemorating the Indian Head nickel.

Partial filmography

 The Spirit of '76 (1917, Lost film) as Gowah
 A Fight for Love (1919, Lost film) as Swift Deer
 The Avenging Arrow (1921, Lost film) as Madoo
 The Primitive Lover (1922) as Chief Johnny Bluebottle
 The Huntress (1923) as Otebaya
 The Iron Horse (1924) as Cheyenne Chief (uncredited)
 The Red Rider (1925) as Indian Chief
 Ranson's Folly (1926) as Chief Standing Bear
 The Frontier Trail (1926) as Chief Gray Wolf
 Mantrap (1926) as Indian (uncredited)
 The Desert's Toll (1926) as Red Eagle
 The Outlaw Breaker (1926) as Indian (uncredited)
 Winners of the Wilderness (1927) as Chief Pontiac
 The Frontiersman (1927) as Grey Eagle
 Painted Ponies (1927)
 Spoilers of the West (1927) as Chief Red Cloud
 Wyoming (1928) as An Indian
 The Overland Telegraph (1929) as Medicine Man
 Sioux Blood (1929) as Crazy Wolf
 The Big Trail (1930) as Indian (uncredited)
 Red Fork Range (1931) as Chief Barking Fox
 Fighting Caravans (1931) as Indian Chief in Opening Credits (uncredited)
 The Last of the Mohicans (1932, Serial) as Huron Warrior (uncredited)
 The Golden West (1932) as Indian (uncredited)
 The Telegraph Trail (1933) as Indian Chief (uncredited)
 King of the Arena (1933) as Circus Indian (uncredited)
 Massacre (1934) as Indian Judge (uncredited)
 Wheels of Destiny (1934) as Chief War Eagle
 The Cat's-Paw (1934) as Chinese Guards (uncredited)
 Wake Up and Dream (1934) as 1st Indian (uncredited)
 The Miracle Rider (1935, Serial) as Old Indian [Ch. 1] (uncredited)
 The Farmer Takes a Wife (1935) as Indian (uncredited)
 The Singing Vagabond (1935) as Chief White Eagle (uncredited)
 Custer's Last Stand (1936, Serial) as Medicine Man [Ch. 9]
 The Adventures of Frank Merriwell (1936, Serial) as Indian John (uncredited)
 Daniel Boone (1936) as Wyandotte Warrior (uncredited)
 The Bold Caballero (1936) as Tavern Indian (uncredited)
 Maid of Salem (1937) as Indian (uncredited)
 Lost Horizon (1937) as Porter (uncredited)
 Hills of Old Wyoming (1937) (with Hopalong Cassidy) as Chief Big Tree
 The Painted Stallion (1937, Serial) as Commanche Chief (uncredited)
 Prairie Thunder (1937) as Indian (uncredited)
 The Girl of the Golden West (1938) as Indian Chief in Prologue (uncredited)
 Flaming Frontiers (1938, Serial) as Arapaho Chief [Chs. 12-13] (uncredited)
 Hawk of the Wilderness (1938, Serial) as Medicine Man (uncredited)
 Stagecoach (1939) as Apache Scout (uncredited)
 Susannah of the Mounties (1939) as Chief (uncredited)
 The Oregon Trail (1939, Serial) as Spotted Elk (uncredited)
 Drums Along the Mohawk (1939) as Blue Back
 Destry Rides Again (1939) as Indian in Saloon (uncredited)
 Heroes of the Saddle (1940) as Rodeo Indian (uncredited)
 Pioneers of the West (1940) as Indian Chief (uncredited)
 Brigham Young (1940) as Big Elk
 Too Many Girls (1940) as Chief (uncredited)
 North West Mounted Police (1940) as Blue Owl (uncredited)
 Hudson's Bay (1941) as Chief
 Western Union (1941) as Chief Spotted Horse
 Las Vegas Nights (1941) as Indian (uncredited)
 Unconquered (1947) as Indian (uncredited)
 She Wore a Yellow Ribbon (1949) as Chief Pony That Walks
 Devil's Doorway (1950) as Thundercloud

References

External links

 
 
Rogue River War of 1855-1856

1877 births
1967 deaths
American male film actors
American male silent film actors
20th-century American male actors
Male actors from Michigan
First Nations male actors
People from Onondaga County, New York
Burials in New York (state)
Male actors from Buffalo, New York